Richard John Sawka II, better known as Colby Keller (born October 18, 1980) is an American visual artist and pornographic actor. His career in porn film started in 2004 at Sean Cody and subsequently expanded to include such studios as Cocksure Men, Randy Blue, Titan Men, Falcon, CockyBoys and Men.com. Keller has also appeared in the short, Zolushka, a queer retelling of Cinderella, and in the popular series Capitol Hill, both by the cult filmmaker Wes Hurley.

Biography

Born October 18, 1980, in Michigan, Colby Keller was raised in Texas where he graduated from the University of Houston with a bachelor's degree in anthropology. In addition, he is a graduate of The Maryland Institute College of Art, with a Master of Fine Arts (MFA) in visual and performing arts.

During his time performing in gay porn, Keller continued to work as an artist. His two most notable art projects are Pieces of Eight and Everything But Lenin, both collaborative performance pieces. Pieces of Eight involved multiple projects and multiple collaborations while Everything But Lenin involved giving away all of his earthly possessions with the exception a large metal plaque of Lenin and was precipitated by an eviction notice presented to residents of his Baltimore apartment complex in March 2014. Those who took part received a signed certificate as project participants.

In addition to his porn performances and art projects, Keller appeared in a series of sex advice videos (titled In Bed With Colby Keller) for Manhunt. The series ran from 2012 until 2014 and resulted in 62 videos.

In 2012, Keller appeared in a masquerade-themed music video for the song "After Dark", by dance artists Undercover. And, in his 2013 music video for "Cannibal", Natti Vogel enlisted Keller to play a hooded witch to his tempted Hansel in a recreation of Hansel and Gretel.

In 2013, Keller collaborated with artist Cameron Stalheim on a project called Myth as Object, which resulted in a 2014 exhibit as Stalheim's MFA graduating thesis at the Maryland Institute College of Art. Keller's body was cast in silicone to create a thirty-foot long merman sculpture in his likeness.

In 2014, Keller sold his belongings and began a project Colby Does America, composed of porn scenes filmed across every state in the United States.

In 2016, Keller was presented the Cybersocket Web Award for Best Personality. He is a featured model in the 2016 Spring/Summer Vivienne Westwood Mirror the World campaign.

In 2017, he appeared in two episodes of the third season of EastSiders.

Politics
Keller is a communist who credits his communist beliefs to a strict Christian upbringing with the Assemblies of God.

Keller voted for Donald Trump in the 2016 United States presidential election, stating, "I'm going to vote for Trump! I think he's a destabilizing force...I don't support or endorse any of Trump’s policies. I just think it'll escalate the problem, which is the best we can hope for."

Partial filmography

See also
 List of male performers in gay porn films

References

External links

 Keller's blog, Big Shoe Diaries
 
 
 

1980 births
Living people
American actors in gay pornographic films
American communists
American video artists
Christian communists
Pornographic film actors from Michigan
Male actors from Texas
Artists from Michigan
Artists from Texas
Maryland socialists
Michigan socialists
Texas socialists
American gay actors
American gay artists
Gay pornographic film actors
People from Baltimore
Pornographic film actors from Maryland
Sex worker activists in the United States
University of Houston alumni
American people of Polish descent